Gary Logan (born ) is a Scottish wheelchair curler.

Teams

References

External links 

Living people
1971 births
Scottish male curlers
Scottish wheelchair curlers
Place of birth missing (living people)